"Heart on My Sleeve" may refer to:

 "Heart on My Sleeve" (Gallagher & Lyle song), 1976 song by Gallagher & Lyle 
 "Heart on My Sleeve" (Michael Johns song), 2009 song by Michael Johns
 Heart on My Sleeve (album), by Ella Mai, released in 2022
 Heart on My Sleeve, a 2014 album by Mary Lambert